Jason Pyrah (born April 6, 1969, in Springfield, Missouri) is an American athlete who participated in the 1500-meter run at the 1996 and 2000 Summer Olympics. He did not qualify for the final in 1996, but did qualify in 2000, placing 10th.

As a teenager he attended Willard High School in Willard, Missouri where he excelled in track and field. He was a Missouri state track champion in multiple events over two years. Pyrah did not compete in the 1990–91 season because of a mission to Bolivia.  Pyrah graduated from Brigham Young University in 1993. In 1994, he won the Fifth Avenue Mile, and in 1995, he won a bronze medal in the 1500-meter run at the Pan American Games. His mile best is a 3:55.

External links

References

Living people
1969 births
American male middle-distance runners
Athletes (track and field) at the 1995 Pan American Games
Athletes (track and field) at the 1996 Summer Olympics
Athletes (track and field) at the 2000 Summer Olympics
Olympic track and field athletes of the United States
Pan American Games bronze medalists for the United States
Pan American Games medalists in athletics (track and field)
Sportspeople from Springfield, Missouri
Track and field athletes from Missouri
BYU Cougars men's track and field athletes
Medalists at the 1995 Pan American Games
20th-century American people